Dero Ames Saunders (1914–2002) was an American journalist and classical scholar.

He was born in Starkville, Mississippi. A graduate of Dartmouth College, he was executive editor of Forbes magazine from 1960–1981, and continued to edit a regular column until 1999.

As a reporter for Fortune magazine in 1957 he conducted the only known press interview with reclusive American businessman Daniel Ludwig.

With John H. Collins he compiled a noted translation of Theodor Mommsen's History of Rome He is also known for his abridged version of Edward Gibbon's The History of the Decline and Fall of the Roman Empire.

References

American male journalists
20th-century American journalists
American classical scholars
1914 births
2002 deaths
Dartmouth College alumni